Olearia arborescens, also known as common tree daisy is a common shrub or small tree of New Zealand. It grows in lowland to alpine scrubland in the North Island from East Cape southwards, and throughout the South and Stewart Islands.

The leaves of the plant are wide, oval-shaped, wavy and toothed, and are greyish underneath. O. arborescens produces white bunched flowers in spring to summer.

References

Flora of New Zealand
arborescens